Marcel Sakáč (born 29 May 1972) is a Slovak former professional ice hockey player who played as a centre with HC Slovan Bratislava in the Slovak Extraliga as well as in Germany and brief spells in Italy, Austria and Sweden. 

His father of the same name, a goaltender, played for the same club and won two IIHF World Championships with Czechoslovakia in the 1970s.

References

External links
 Profile, ism-sports.sk; accessed 10 December 2016. 

1972 births
Living people
HC Slovan Bratislava players
Slovak ice hockey centres
Ice hockey people from Bratislava
Czechoslovak ice hockey centres
Czechoslovak expatriate sportspeople in Canada
Czechoslovak expatriate ice hockey people
Penticton Panthers players
Memphis RiverKings players
Huntington Blizzard players
1. EV Weiden players
HC Alleghe players
Graz 99ers players
Slovak expatriate ice hockey players in the United States
Slovak expatriate ice hockey players in Germany
Slovak expatriate ice hockey players in Sweden
Slovak expatriate sportspeople in Italy
Slovak expatriate sportspeople in Austria
Expatriate ice hockey players in Austria
Expatriate ice hockey players in Italy